KFRX (106.3 FM) is a radio station broadcasting a Top 40 (CHR) format. Licensed to Lincoln, Nebraska, United States, the station serves the Lincoln area.  The station is currently owned by Alpha Media, through licensee Digity 3E License, LLC. KFRX's studios are located on Cornhusker Highway in Northeast Lincoln, while its transmitter is located at the master antenna farm at South 84th Street and Yankee Hill Road in the far southeast part of Lincoln.

One of the longest-lived FM signals in Lincoln, the station started as KECK-FM (calls that were shared with its AM counterpart, which has since gone dark). It switched to the name KHAT in the mid-1970s. For much of the decade, it sported a country music and "progressive" country music format as KHAT. In the early 1980s, KHAT switched to an adult contemporary format. In July 1990, after a weekend of stunting with all-Phil Collins songs, KHAT was rebranded as "MIX 106", while retaining the AC format, and adopted new call letters KMXA. However, "Mix" was a failure in the ratings. On March 2, 1992, the station flipped to active rock as "106.3 The Blaze", under new call letters KIBZ. The format was an immense success. As part of a major format shuffle, on March 19, 2004, at noon, KIBZ moved to 104.1 FM, while 106.3 began stunting with construction noises; this led to the debut of a new AC format under the "My 106.3" branding and KLMY call letters on March 24. At 6 a.m. on September 18, 2007, KLMY dropped the format and adopted KFRX's Top 40 format and call letters after their former frequency (102.7 FM) flipped to AC and was later sold and moved to the Omaha market.

References

External links 

FRX
Contemporary hit radio stations in the United States
Mass media in Lincoln, Nebraska
Alpha Media radio stations